This is a list of the current and decommissioned air support squadrons in the United States Marine Corps that provide the Marine Direct Air Support Center for the Marine Air-Ground Task Force.

Current

Decommissioned 

United States Marine Corps air support squadrons